Bolsa de Valores (often shortened to Bolsa), Spanish and Portuguese for Stock Exchange, can refer to:

B3, São Paulo; Brazil's largest stock exchange
Bolsa de Madrid, Spain
Bolsa de Valores de Cabo Verde, Cape Verde
Bolsa de Valores de Montevideo, Uruguay
Bolsa de Valores de Mozambique
Bolsa de Valores de Nicaragua
Bolsa de Valores de la República Dominicana
Bolsa de Valores y Productos de Asunción, Paraguay
Euronext Lisbon, Portugal
Bolsa de Valores de Colombia (or BVC), Colombian Securities Exchange
Bolsa de Valores de Lima (or BVL), Lima Stock Exchange, Peru
Bolsa de Valores de Caracas (or BVC), Caracas Stock Exchange, Venezuela
Bolsa Mexicana de Valores (or BMV), Mexican Stock Exchange
Bolsa de Valores do Rio de Janeiro (or BVRJ), Rio de Janeiro Stock Exchange, Brazil's second largest stock exchange

See also
List of stock exchanges in the Americas